The 2011–12 season was Falkirk's second consecutive season in the Scottish First Division, having been relegated from the Scottish Premier League at the end of season 2009–10. Falkirk also competed in the Challenge Cup, League Cup and the Scottish Cup.

Summary
Falkirk finished third in the First Division. They reached the semi final of the League Cup, the fifth round of the Scottish Cup, and won the Challenge Cup beating Hamilton 1–0 in the final.

Results and fixtures

Pre season

Scottish First Division

Scottish Challenge Cup

Scottish League Cup

Scottish Cup

Player statistics

Captains

Squad
Last updated 5 May 2012

|}

Disciplinary record
Includes all competitive matches.
Last updated 5 May 2012

Awards

Last updated 5 May 2012

League table

Transfers
Falkirk started the season by releasing Eighteen Players.

Players in

Players out

References

Falkirk
Falkirk F.C. seasons